Psychology (from  psykhē "breath, spirit, soul"; and , -logia "study of") is an academic and applied discipline involving the scientific study of human mental functions and behavior. Occasionally, in addition or opposition to employing the scientific method, it also relies on symbolic interpretation and critical analysis, although these traditions have tended to be less pronounced than in other social sciences, such as sociology. Psychologists study phenomena such as perception, cognition, emotion, personality, behavior, and interpersonal relationships. Some, especially depth psychologists, also study the unconscious mind.

Articles related to psychology (excluding psychologists – see list of psychologists) include:


0–9

A

B

C

D

E

F

G

H

I

J

K

L

M

N

O

P

Q

R

S

T

U

V

W

X

Y

Z

See also 
 Psychology-related
Outline of psychology
List of counseling topics
Psychology journals
List of psychology topic lists
List of thinking-related topic lists
 General reference
List of reference pages
List of topic lists

References 

Psychology articles